Thomas Parsons  was an Irish Anglican priest: the Archdeacon of Ardfert from 1641 to 1644.

References

17th-century Irish Anglican priests
Archdeacons of Ardfert